Collagenase 3 is an enzyme that in humans is encoded by the MMP13 gene. It is a member of the matrix metalloproteinase (MMP) family. Like most MMPs, it is secreted as an inactive pro-form. MMP-13 has an predicted molecular weight around 54 kDa. It is activated once the pro-domain is cleaved, leaving an active enzyme composed of the catalytic domain and the hemopexin-like domain . Although the actual mechanism has not been described, the hemopexin domain participates in collagen degradation, the catalytic domain alone being particularly inefficient in collagen degradation. During embryonic development, MMP-13 is expressed in the skeleton as required for restructuring the collagen matrix for bone mineralization. In pathological situations it is highly overexpressed; this occurs in human carcinomas, rheumatoid arthritis and osteoarthritis.

Proteins of the matrix metalloproteinase (MMP) family are involved in the breakdown of extracellular matrix in normal physiological processes, such as embryonic development, reproduction, and tissue remodeling, as well as in disease processes, such as arthritis and metastasis. Most MMPs are secreted as inactive proproteins which are activated when cleaved by extracellular proteinases. The protein encoded by this gene cleaves type II collagen more efficiently than types I and III. It may be involved in articular cartilage turnover and cartilage pathophysiology associated with osteoarthritis. The gene is part of a cluster of MMP genes which localize to chromosome 11q22.3.

Regulation 

Transcriptional regulation of MMP-13 is tightly controlled due to its potent proteolytic capacity. There are several binding domains for various transcription factors including AP-1, PEA-3 and OSE-2 as well as a sequence with homology to a TGF-β inhibitory element (TIE). Moreover, several cytokines and growth factors have been demonstrated to affect Mmp13 gene expression, including parathyroid hormone, IGF-1, TGF-β, hepatocyte growth factor and many inflammatory cytokines such as IL-1α and IL-1β.
 
The upstream regulatory region of the Mmp13 gene contains a number of transcription factor binding sites but it was recently discovered that there is a conserved forkhead response element (FHRE) consensus sequence for FOXO3a in the human, mouse and rat Mmp13 promoter. Endogenous FOXO3a activation results in marked upregulation of Mmp13 expression which is capable of promoting extracellular matrix degradation and apoptotic cell death.

Clinical Relevance 

MMP-13 has long been a protein of interest in the context of osteoarthritis and rheumatoid arthritis.

The role of MMP-13 has also been thoroughly examined in atherosclerosis, specifically in potentially reducing the collagen content of the fibrous cap.

References

Further reading

External links 
 The MEROPS online database for peptidases and their inhibitors: M10.013

Matrix metalloproteinases
Human proteins
EC 3.4.24